Algeria is one of the few countries that, despite being a majority Sunni Arab country, has been friendly towards mostly Shia Iran. Although enjoying a cordial relationship, at times relations between two countries have been strained, such as during the Algerian Civil War in the 1990s, or with the current position of the Arab world towards Iran. Nonetheless, Algeria retains close and friendly ties with Iran due to its neutrality at the expense of Saudi Arabia.

History

Islamic conquest
The Rustamid dynasty, a famous Ibadi Islamic dynasty in Algeria, was of Persian origin.

Modern relations
After the independence of Algeria, then-Pahlavi Iran soon established relations with Algeria, but due to its remoteness and lack of interests, Algeria and Iran remained somewhat modest relations.

When the Iranian Revolution overthrew the Shah and replaced the monarchy with a theocratic Republic, Algeria served as representative of Iran's interests in the United States from 1981 until the Algerian Civil War.

Algerian Civil War
During the war, Algeria accused Iran, alongside Saudi Arabia, Morocco, Sudan and Libya for meddling in the conflict and supporting the hardcore Armed Islamic Group of Algeria which killed nearly 200.000 people. Iran was found to have used Sudan as a transit supporting rebels and secretly supported by Sudan.

Chadli Bendjedid, then-President of Algeria, believed that Algeria could not become the other Iran, and the Islamists, supported by both Iran and Saudi Arabia, were suppressed. This low-point relations pushed Algeria to finally cede their mission of representing Iran's interests in the United States in response to Iran's supports to GIA. Pakistan later replaced Algeria as representative of Iran's interests.

Modern relations
Since the end of the civil war, Algeria and Iran re-approached the relationship in 2000 by Algerian President Abdelaziz Bouteflika and Iranian counterpart Mohammad Khatami, but there has been a strong mistrust alongside Algerian elites and majority Algerian population upon Iranian political desires, a legacy left behind because of Iran's involvement in the Algerian Civil War. Algeria still has some limits towards Iran's political desires in the country.

Nonetheless, in spite of historical concerns and mistrusts, Algeria and Iran still share some similar views. Algeria and Iran both opposed arming to the opposition groups in Syria amidst the Syrian Civil War or the same current Yemeni Civil War although limited in level terms as Iran directly involved in these wars while Algeria called for total mediations and ceasefires. Algeria is one of few Arab nations that is willing to cooperate with Iran.

Algeria keeps a strong cultural relationship with Iran, a legacy of its ensure neutrality. Economic ties between two nations are also growing expensively and positively, paving the way for deeper ties between the two nations.

Algerian Embassy 
Algeria maintains an embassy in Tehran.

 Ambassador Abdelmoun’aam Ahriz

Iranian Embassy 
Iran has an embassy in Algiers.

 Ambassador Hossein Mashalchizadeh

See also
Algeria–Saudi Arabia relations
Arab League–Iran relations

References

External links
Embassy of Algeria in Iran
Embassy of the Islamic Republic of Iran in Algiers

 
Iran
Bilateral relations of Iran